Witu may be:
 Vitu language (New Guinea)
 Dusun Witu language (Borneo)
 Wiru language (New Guinea)